In Combo is the debut album released by the American New wave band The Suburbs, released in 1980.

Reception

Writing for Allmusic, music critic Stewart Mason called the album "one of the pioneering releases of the American post-punk indie scene, and proof that the Minneapolis scene of the early '80s wasn't just Replacements and Hüsker Dü-style guitar aggression... Later albums were arguably more complex, but In Combo remains probably the Suburbs' greatest vinyl moment."

Track listing
All songs composed by The Suburbs.
"Hobnobbin With the Executives" – 2:02
"Tiny People" – 2:36
"DD 69" – 1:45
"Goggles On" – 3:20
"Black Leather Stick" – 2:49
"Eyesight" – 2:58
"Big Steer Blues" – 2:26
"Baby Heartbeat" – 2:42
"Cows" – 1:38
"Underwater Lovers" – 2:34
"Cig Machine" – 1:25
"Drinking" – 4:14
"Chemistry Set" – 1:11

Personnel
 Chan Poling – keyboards, vocals
 Beej Chaney – Beejtar, vocals
 Hugo Klaers – drums
 Bruce C. Allen – guitar, vocals
 Michael Halliday – bass

Production notes
Paul Stark – producer, engineer
Doug Sax – digital remastering
Robert Hadley – digital remastering

References

External links
  The album page on the Twin/Tone website.

1980 albums
The Suburbs albums
Twin/Tone Records albums